Princeton Club, is a club promoted by Merlin Recreation Pvt. Ltd. a Merlin Group company, located on at, 26, Prince Anwar Shah Road, near Rabindra Sarobar Metro Station.

Design
One of the leading architects of Kolkata Dulal Mukherjee & Associates  have designed the building complex. The club layout plans have been carried out by Edifice, a leading architect firm of Mumbai and the interior designing and decoration has been planned by architect Kamal Periwal and architect Amrita Mukherjee of Maheshwari & Associates.

Facilities
The club is mainly popular for organizing Corporate workshops, Business conferences, Training sessions, Annual General Meetings, Press conferences, Dealers' meets, Product launches, Exhibitions. The club has a bar, swimming pool, conference room, gym etc.

Membership
One needs to apply for the membership by filling up a form. Deposit Rs. 20,000/- and the person will be called for interview within 7 days. The membership fee is 1,90,000. Members don't have voting right. Memberships are transferable. Rupees
The club offers different types of memberships-
 Family membership
 Individual membership
 Corporate membership
 Temporary membership
 Sports membership
 Honorary membership

See also 
 Tantra

References

Further reading

External links
 Club Website

Buildings and structures in Kolkata
Drinking establishments in Asia
Food and drink companies of India
Music venues in India
Restaurants in Kolkata
Clubs and societies in India
Companies based in Kolkata
Companies with year of establishment missing